Teulet is a French surname. Notable people with the surname include:

Alexandre Teulet (1807–1866), French Palaeographer, archivist, and historian
Romain Teulet (born 1978), French rugby union player

See also
Mouzieys-Teulet, a French commune

French-language surnames